Vera cemetery is cemetery in Vera district in Tbilisi, Georgia.

History
The cemetery in Tbilisi Vera district was founded in 1836. In 1844 an Armenian church, Holy Cross (Surb Khach), was built inside the cemetery by David Tamashev’s financial support. Later, the territory of cemetery was expanded. Many famous Armenians of Tiflis were buried in the cemetery, including: General Yeremia Artsuni, the first mayor of Tiflis; Harutyun Tumanyan, writer and teacher; landowner Natalia Skhhoyan; the businessman, industrialist and tobacco manufacturer Mikhail Bozarchyants; linguist, educator and armenologist Shahan Jrpetyan; the first zincographer of Tiflis Sarkis Soghomonyan; architect Gavril Ter-Mikelov; doctor Nikoghayos Khudadyan, etc.

After 1920 funerals in the cemetery were stopped.

Georganisation
In 1992, with coming to power of Zviad Gamsakhurdia, the cemetery was vandalized. Gamsakhurdia followers began to destroy the cemetery. During the reconstruction of the church of the Holy Cross (Surb Khach) on the initiative of Georgian composer Nodar Gigauri, it was renamed the Church of Saint Pantaleon and turned into a Georgian Orthodox church. Tombstones inside the church, under which were stored the urn with the ashes of the dead, were covered with Turkish tiles. In the cemetery, space for new graves for Georgians were created by destroying the graves of Armenian burials.

The cemetery of Vera was known with its familial tombs: Ananovs, Yenikolopovs, Tsurinovs, Kamoyans, Babanasovs, Avan Yuzbashyans, Argutyans, etc. Today, the graves of many famous Armenians are without tombstones.

See also
 Armenians in Tbilisi
 List of cemeteries in Georgia (country)

References

External links
 Gallery in The Chronicle of a Long Appropriation Process
 National Committee of the Armenians of Georgia
 ԹԻՖԼԻՍԱՀԱՅՈՒԹՅՈՒՆ. ԺԱՄԱՆԱԿԻ ՄԱՐՏԱՀՐԱՎԵՐՆԵՐՆ ՈՒ ՀԱՄԱՅՆՔԻ ՀԵՌԱՆԿԱՐՆԵՐԸ (Tbilisi Armenians: Challenges and Future) by Tamara Vardanyan

Cemeteries in Georgia (country)
Buildings and structures in Tbilisi
Armenian diaspora in Georgia (country)
Armenian cemeteries